Gerstacker, Gerstäcker or Gerstaecker is a German surname. Notable people with the surname include:

Carl Eduard Adolph Gerstaecker (1828–1895), German zoologist and entomologist
Friedrich Gerstäcker (1816–1872), German traveler and novelist
Georg Gerstäcker (1889–1949), German wrestler

German-language surnames
Occupational surnames